La Londe-les-Maures is a commune in the Var department in the Provence-Alpes-Côte d'Azur region in southeastern France.

Population

Points of interest
Jardin d'Oiseaux Tropicaux
La Londe Jazz Festival

See also
Communes of the Var department

References

Communes of Var (department)
Populated coastal places in France